This is a list of properties and districts in Morgan County, Georgia that are listed on the National Register of Historic Places (NRHP).

Current listings

|}

References

Morgan
Buildings and structures in Morgan County, Georgia